is a Japanese weightlifter. He competed at the 1996 Summer Olympics and the 2000 Summer Olympics.

References

1973 births
Living people
Japanese male weightlifters
Olympic weightlifters of Japan
Weightlifters at the 1996 Summer Olympics
Weightlifters at the 2000 Summer Olympics
Place of birth missing (living people)
Weightlifters at the 1994 Asian Games
Weightlifters at the 1998 Asian Games
Asian Games competitors for Japan
20th-century Japanese people
21st-century Japanese people